Phrynetopsis is a genus of longhorn beetles of the subfamily Lamiinae, containing the following species: 

 Phrynetopsis fuscicornis (Chevrolat, 1856)
 Phrynetopsis kolbei Gahan, 1909
 Phrynetopsis loveni Aurivillius, 1925
 Phrynetopsis marshalli Breuning, 1935
 Phrynetopsis thomensis Jordan, 1903
 Phrynetopsis trituberculata Kolbe, 1894
 Phrynetopsis variegata (Reiche, 1849)

References

Phrynetini